Lin Zhi-ai is a Chinese rower. She has won gold medals in the lightweight women's four at World Rowing Championships in 1988 and 1989. At the 1990 World Rowing Championships, she won a bronze medal in the lightweight women's four. At the 1991 World Rowing Championships, she came seventh with the women's eight. At the 1992 Summer Olympics in Barcelona, Spain, she came fifths in the women's eight.

References

Chinese female rowers
Year of birth missing (living people)
Rowers at the 1992 Summer Olympics
World Rowing Championships medalists for China
Asian Games medalists in rowing
Rowers at the 1990 Asian Games
Asian Games gold medalists for China
Medalists at the 1990 Asian Games
Olympic rowers of China
Living people
20th-century Chinese women
21st-century Chinese women